Aida Salyanova (born August 1972) is a deputy of the Jogorku Kenesh, Prosecutor General of Kyrgyzstan (2011-2015), Minister of Justice (2010), and State Counselor of Justice Class 3. She is married and has a son and two daughters.

Early life and career
Aida Salyanova was born on 6 August 1972 in the city of Naryn in the Kyrgyz SSR. In 1991 she graduated from Frunze College Soviet Torgo.

 1996–1997: University of the Kyrgyz National University professor.
 1997–2005: Jogorku Kenesh of the Kyrgyz Republic, the expert of the legal department.
 In 2000, she became a candidate of legal sciences, associate professor.
 2005–2008: Jogorku Kenesh of the Kyrgyz Republic, Head of the Department for Constitutional Legislation, State Structure, Legality and judicial and legal reform of the Jogorku Kenesh.
 2008–2010: The Ministry of Justice of the Kyrgyz Republic, the State Secretary.
 July 14, 2010 – 20 December 2010: The Minister of Justice of the Kyrgyz Republic.
 December 20, 2010 – 31 March 2014: Plenipotentiary Representative of the President of Kyrgyzstan in Ken Jogorku
 14 April 2011 – 22 January 2015: The Prosecutor General of the Kyrgyz Republic.
 October 4, 2015 – present: Member of the Parliament of VI convocation.

References 

1972 births
Living people
Kyrgyzstani lawyers
Government ministers of Kyrgyzstan
Prosecutors
Women government ministers of Kyrgyzstan
Members of the Supreme Council (Kyrgyzstan)
People from Naryn
21st-century Kyrgyzstani women politicians
21st-century Kyrgyzstani politicians
Academic staff of Kyrgyz National University